Ferrovie Nord Milano (FNM S.p.A.) is an Italian public transport company: the second largest railway company in Italy. It operates primarily in the northern Italian regions of Lombardy and  Piedmont and in Canton Ticino in southern Switzerland. Listed on the Borsa Italiana, its main shareholders are the Lombardy Region (57.57%), Ferrovie dello Stato (14.5%) and Aurelia S.p.A. (3%).

History
The company was founded as Società Anonima Ferrovie Milano-Saronno e Milano-Erba in 1877 by the Belgian Albert Vaucamps. The Milan-Saronno railroad was inaugurated on 22 March 1879, while the Milan-Erba was opened later in December the same year. In 1883 the company was rechristened Società Anonima per le Ferrovie Nord Milano (FNM). Five years later the consortium was joined by Società per le Ferrovie del Ticino, who held the Como-Malnate-Varese-Laveno and Saronno-Malnate lines. Until the end of the century FNM also acquired the lines Novara-Seregno and Saronno-Grandate, forming a large network in northern Lombardy in direct competition with the Società per le Strade Ferrate del Mediterraneo. When railways were nationalized in Italy, in 1907, Mediterranea acquired the shares of the Belgian owners.

Electrification of most lines began in 1929, and was completed in 1953. In 1958 passenger service was discontinued on the Saronno-Seregno line, while the Malnate-Grandate line was closed in 1966. In 1974 FNM, a joint stock company starting from 1943, was entirely acquired by the Lombardy regional government.

Two different companies, Ferrovie Nord Milano Esercizio and Ferrovie Nord Milano Autotrasporti, were created in 1985 with responsibilities for rail and road transport respectively. In 2004 the former was again split into two companies, Ferrovie Nord Cargo (for cargo services) and Ferrovie Nord Milano Trasporti (for the passenger one). In 2006 a new logo and new identities for three companies were adopted: Ferrovie Nord Milano Trasporti S.r.l.  became LeNord S.r.l., Ferrovie Nord Milano Esercizio S.p.A. became FERROVIENORD S.p.A. and Ferrovie Nord Cargo S.r.l. became NordCargo S.r.l.. The whole group name became FNM S.p.A..

Since 1993 FERROVIENORD (through LeNord and NordCargo) is managing the Brescia-Iseo-Edolo railway branch, not connected to the main group of lines, centered in the Milan area.

Bus Services by Ferrovie Nord Milano Autoservizi

Province of Brescia 

F23a Saviore-Cedegolo
F23b Valle-Cedegolo
F27 Brescia-Iseo-Edolo
F28 Iseo-Breno
F29 Breno-Edolo
L62 Iseo-Provaglio-Brescia

Province of Como 

C64 Olgiate Comasco-Appiano Gentile-Lomazzo
C66 Appiano Gentile-Lurago Marinone-Lomazzo
C67 Saronno-Fenegrò-Lomazzo
C69 Lomazzo-Tradate
C76 Tradate-Olgiate Comasco
C77 Como-Varese
C84 Cantù-Lomazzo

Province of Varese 

B48 Tradate-Castiglione Olona
B50 Somma Lombardo-Varese
C77 Como-Varese
H203 Saronno-Turate-Saronno
H204 Tradate-Saronno (Caronno Pertusella)
H601 Tradate-Legnano-Busto Arsizio
H632 Varese-Gallarate

Other Bus Services 

Asso-Saronno-Cesenatico-Rimini-Gabicce Mare (summer seasonal long-distance route)
Asso-Saronno-Varazze-Alassio-Sanremo (summer seasonal long-distance route)
Olgiate Comasco-Tradate-Origgio-Cervia-Rimini-Cattolica (summer seasonal long-distance route)
Milan Cadorna-Campione d'Italia

Locomotives & rolling stock

Electric Locomotives 

FNM Class E.600

FNM Class E.610

FNM Class E.620

FNM Class E.630

FNM(Cargo) Class E.640

Diesel Locomotives

D.345 

CNe.518

EMUs

FNM Class E.700

FNM Class E.740

FNM Class E.750

Caravaggio, 

DMUs

ALn668 

Coaches

FNM Az coach

“Casaralta” double decker coach

“Socimi” coach

“Leichtstahlwagen“ coach

Subsidiaries
FERROVIENORD
LeNord
Ferrovie Nord Milano Autoservizi. It hols public road transport in the province of Como, Varese and Val Camonica.
NordCargo
Nord Ing S.r.l., engineering company
NordCom S.p.A., provides informatics services for FNM companies and other public administrations
Nordenergia S.p.A.. It produces electric energy.
CargoClay, another rail cargo company (30% shared by Edicer)
Sems S.r.l. Rents low environmental impact vehicles.
VieNord S.r.l. Provides commercial and marketing services for the group's company.

In fiction
In 2016, in the computer-animated film, Thomas & Friends: The Great Race, one of the Ferrovie Nord Milano's locomotives is modeled for Gina, who also appears in Series 23.

See also
History of railways in Italy
Trenord

References

Historical review at PLAIN 

 
FNM
Transport in Lombardy
FNM
Partly privatized companies of Italy
Government-owned companies of Italy